Álvaro Alfredo Magaña Borja (October 8, 1925 – July 10, 2001)  was a Salvadoran lawyer, economist and politician who was the president of El Salvador from 1982 to 1984.

Biography
He was born in Ahuachapán, El Salvador, and received his master's degree from the University of Chicago in 1952. He was president of the largest mortgage bank of El Salvador (Banco Hipotecario) before the 1982 election. He was sworn in by the President of the Constituent Assembly Roberto D'Aubuisson.

His inauguration as president on May 2, 1982, marked the beginning of elected government in El Salvador after the junta of 1979–1982.

In 1982, the Salvadoran political parties decided that it was time to move on from the rule of the Revolutionary Government Junta (JRG) and decided to install Magaña as head of state.

Soon afterward, both political parties met at Magaña's farm in Apaneca and decided that under Magaña's provisional government, both parties would share in the ministerial posts.

José Napoleón Duarte willingly relinquished his power as head of state and head of the Junta to Magana briefly and instead focused on building up his own Christian Democratic Party with the help of the United States and planned to take back power in the 1984 elections.

References

1925 births
2001 deaths
Presidents of El Salvador
People from Ahuachapán
Salvadoran anti-communists
People of the Salvadoran Civil War
University of Chicago alumni
Nationalist Republican Alliance politicians